Fantasmas en Buenos Aires  (Ghosts in Buenos Aires) is a 1942 Argentine comedy film directed by Enrique Santos Discépolo and starring Pepe Arias.

Production

The 89-minute film was shot in black and white for Argentina Sono Film, directed by Enrique Santos Discépolo.
It was the first film for which he was sole director.
It starred Pepe Arias, María Esther Buschiazzo and Chela Cordero. Mario Maurano wrote the music.

Synopsis

The writers, Manuel A. Meaños, Enrique Santos and Marcelo Menasche Discépolo, based the film on a strange story that circulated in Buenos Aires around 1940. It told of an apparition in the form of a beautiful and enigmatic girl (Buschiazzo) who danced one night with the cashier (Arias) of a large commercial firm.
She apparently had returned from the beyond, and would again fade into the shadows.

Reception

The film has been called one of the most original and compelling films of the trajectory of the great comedian, Pepe Arias.

Full cast
The full cast was:

 Pepe Arias
 María Esther Buschiazzo
 Chela Cordero
 Ramón Garay
 Enrique García Satur
 Carlos Lagrotta
 Zully Moreno
 José Antonio Paonessa
 Julio Renato
 Casimiro Ros

References
Citations

Sources

1942 films
1940s Spanish-language films
Argentine black-and-white films
Films shot in Buenos Aires
Argentine comedy films
1942 comedy films
1940s Argentine films